Infini-D was a 3D computer graphics program developed by Specular International. It was continued by MetaCreations when Specular merged with them, developing up to version 4.5, then combined with Ray Dream Studio to create Carrara. Soon after, Metacreations divested itself of all products other than MetaStream, including Carrara, which was sold to Eovia, who then sold it to the current developer, DAZ, upon Eovia's breaking up.

Infini-D was a diverse package, useful for creating print images as well as web and video media (even spawning an Adobe Dimensions-like basic 3D program aimed at print and multimedia users called LogoMotion.) It was notable for its friendly interface, and ability to queue and distribute render jobs to a render farm, freeing the artist's computer for other tasks. Distributed Rendering was initially handled through a separate program, BackBurner, but it was incorporated into Infini-D with the release of version 4. Infini-D was especially popular in the Macintosh market.

Awards

 Macworld 1996 World Class Award, “Best 3D Modeler/Renderer” 
 New Media 1996 Hyper Award, “Best 3D Software Under $1000”
 Presentations Magazine 1996 Presenter’s Choice Award, “Best Animation Software”
 MacUser 1995 Editor’s Choice Award, “Best New 3D Application”
 Macworld 1994 World Class Award, “Best 3D Product”
 Macworld 1994 Editor’s Choice Award

References

External Links/Sources
Specular Infini-D 3.5 product description on the Wayback Machine (1997)

3D graphics software